Marko Rothmüller (born Aaron Rothmüller; 31 December 190820 January 1993) was a Croatian operatic baritone, composer and pianist.

Early life and education
Rothmüller was born in the village of Trnjani near Slavonski Brod to a Jewish family, which owned a store. He was raised with five siblings (three brothers and two sisters); Branko, Avraham, Erich Cvi, Tilika and Elvira. When he was four, Rothmüller moved to Zagreb with his parents Josef and Ana (née Hahn) Rothmüller. Rothmüller studied at Zagreb Music Academy at the University of Zagreb. He later went to Vienna to train under Regina Weiss, Franz Steiner and Alban Berg. He lived and worked in Zagreb until 1935.

Career
Rothmüller was an artist of exceptional musical culture. In 1932 Rothmüller made his debut in Hamburg, with the role of Ottokar in "Der Freischütz", and was immediately ranked among the leading European interpreters of heroic baritone rôles. Because of antisemitism in Nazi Germany, Rothmüller returned home to Zagreb in 1933. In 1935 he moved to Zurich, where until 1947 he was a permanent member of the Zurich opera emphasizing the roles in Verdi and Wagner operas. Between 1946 and 1949, he was a member of the Vienna State Opera. In London's Royal Opera House, Rothmüller made his debut in 1939 under the direction of Sir Thomas Beecham. Rothmüller was permanent member of the Royal Opera House from 1948 until 1952. In the Glyndebourne Opera House he performed from 1949 until 1955. Occasionally he also appeared in Glyndebourne productions in Edinburgh as well. He appeared on British television in performances of Macbeth and La Forza del Destino. HMV issued a few 78 rpm records on their plum label featuring Rothmüller in rôles from Così fan Tutte, Zauberflöte, Tannhäuser, Rigoletto, Tosca and Andrea Chenier. The Verdi and Puccini performances were much admired in The Record Guide, but the discs were soon deleted and are now very rare. Rothmüller made his debut in United States in 1948, at the New York City Opera. He often performed on the concerts and opera stages across the United States. Rothmüller debuted at the Metropolitan Opera, New York City, in 1959 and performed there until 1961, and again in season 1964/65. In 1955 he was appointed as the professor of singing at Indiana University in Bloomington, Indiana. His interest in the Jewish music prompted him to research its history. He arranged the Sephardi folk songs, and in Zagreb in 1932, and Zurich in 1942, Rothmüller founded Omanut, society for the fostering of Jewish music. He was a master of the song interpretation. Rothmüller also wrote a book on the history of Jewish music. In 1983 he edited and published his late brother's Cvi Rotem's book "David Schwarz Tragödie des Erfinders Zur Geschichte des Luftschiffes".

Personal life
Rothmüller was married to Ela (née Reiss) with whom he had two sons, Ilan and Daniel. He died in Bloomington Indiana, on 20 January 1993, and was survived by his second wife, Margrit.

Compositions
 Three Palestinian folk songs for mixed chorus and piano, Vienna 1931.
 Hajimu Nahmanu Bjaliku u spomen for violin, viola and violoncello, Zagreb 1936.
 Divertimento for solo trombone, timpani and string orchestra, London 1955.
 Mit Shakespeares XXX. Sonett for string quartet, published in: C.T.Frey-Wehrlin, ur., Festschrift zum 60. Geburtstag C.A. Meier (Zürich, 1965) 9-13.
 Religious Sephardic folk songs
 Symphony for strings
 Two string quartets

Scientific work
 Die Musik der Juden: Versuch einer geschichtlichen Darstellung ihrer Entwicklung (Zürich, 1951.)
 The Music of the Jews: An Historical Appreciation (London, 1953; New York, 1954 i 1960; Cranbury 1975.)
 Pronunciation of German Diction: Guidelines and Exercises for the Pronunciation of German in Speech and in Singing for Speakers of English (Bloomington, Indiana 1978.)

References

Bibliography

External links
Interview with Marko Rothmuller, May 18, 1985

1908 births
1993 deaths
People from Slavonski Brod
Croatian Jews
Austro-Hungarian Jews
University of Zagreb alumni
Croatian Austro-Hungarians
Croatian composers
Jewish classical composers
Jewish classical pianists
Yugoslav emigrants to the United States
American people of Croatian-Jewish descent
20th-century classical pianists
20th-century composers
Male classical composers
Male classical pianists
20th-century male musicians
Yugoslav expatriates in Austria